The 1986 Florida State Seminoles football team represented Florida State University in the 1986 NCAA Division I-A football season. The team was coached by Bobby Bowden and played their home games at Doak Campbell Stadium.

Schedule

Season summary

Toledo

Nebraska

North Carolina

at Michigan

Tulane

Wichita St

at Louisville

at Miami (FL)

at South Carolina

Southern Miss

Homecoming

Florida

vs. Indiana (All-American Bowl)

References

Florida State
Florida State Seminoles football seasons
All-American Bowl champion seasons
Florida State Seminoles football